Alpha Breezy Kamara (born 1 January 1978) is an Olympic athlete from Sierra Leone. He competed in the 100 metres dash at the 2000 Summer Olympics in Sydney, Australia. Kamara finished eighth in his heat with a time of 10.74, .37 of a second off the heat winner of Jason Gardener of Great Britain. He finished 73rd overall out of the 95 runners that finished the original heats.

External links

1978 births
Living people
Sierra Leonean male sprinters
Athletes (track and field) at the 2000 Summer Olympics
Olympic athletes of Sierra Leone
Athletes (track and field) at the 1998 Commonwealth Games
Commonwealth Games competitors for Sierra Leone